The Dreamachine (a contraction of Dream Machine) is a stroboscopic flickering light art device that produces eidetic visual stimuli. Artist Brion Gysin and William S. Burroughs' "systems adviser" Ian Sommerville created the Dreamachine after reading William Grey Walter's book, The Living Brain.

History
In its original form, a Dreamachine is a work of light art made from a cylinder with regularly spaced shapes cut out of its sides. The cylinder is then placed on a record turntable and rotated, depending on the scale, at either 78 or 45 revolutions per minute. A light bulb is suspended in the center of the cylinder with the rotation speed making light emanate from the holes at a consistently pulsating frequency range of 8–13 flickers per second. It is meant to be looked at through closed eyelids, upon which moving yantra-like mandala visual patterns emerge, and an alpha wave mental state is induced. The frequency of the pulsations corresponds to the electrical oscillations normally present in the human brain while relaxing. In 1996, the Los Angeles Times deemed David Woodard's iteration of the Dreamachine "the most interesting object" in Burroughs' major visual retrospective Ports of Entry at LACMA. In a 2019 critical study, Raj Chandarlapaty, a scholar of the Beat movement, revisits and examines Woodard's "idea-shattering" approach to the Dreamachine.

The Dreamachine is the subject of the National Film Board of Canada 2008 feature documentary film FLicKeR, by Nik Sheehan.

The same flickering light effect is used in modern electronic devices known as mind machines.

Use

A Dreamachine is "viewed" with the eyes closed: the pulsating light stimulates the optic nerve and thus alters the brain's electrical oscillations. As users adjust to the experience, they see increasingly complex animated yantra-like patterns of color behind their closed eyelids (similar effects may be seen when travelling as a passenger in a car or bus; close your eyes as the vehicle passes through the flickering shadows cast by regularly spaced roadside trees, streetlights or tunnel striplights—these were the hypnagogic effects Brion Gysin said he sought to recreate with the device). It is claimed that by using a Dreamachine meditatively, users enter an alphawave, or hypnagogic state. This experience may sometimes be quite intense, but to escape from it, one needs only to open one's eyes.
The Dreamachine may be dangerous for persons with photosensitive epilepsy or other nervous disorders. It is thought that one out of 10,000 adults will experience a seizure while viewing the device; about twice as many children will have a similar ill effect.

Unboxed
The 2022 Unboxed: Creativity in the UK touring festival included a Dreamachine project involving a series of microcontroller-controlled lights rather than a rotating cylinder, and a surround-sound soundtrack by Jon Hopkins. The experience was scaled up to use an octagonal facility two storeys high with a capacity of about 20 people at once in a circular seating arrangement. It was praised by a reviewer in The Guardian as "as close to state-funded psychedelic drugs as you can get" and "the one good thing to come out of Brexit and worth every penny".

See also
Brainwave entrainment
Jan E. Purkyně
Mind machine
Feraliminal Lycanthropizer (the opposite effect machine)

Notes

References
Cecil, Paul. (2000). Flickers of the Dreamachine.  Download excerpts.

Further reading

External links

Dreamachine exhibition at Cabaret Voltaire (Zurich)
Dreamachine in permanent collection at Beat Museum
Khoroshylova, O. A., "Demonstration unit" at Freud's Dreams Museum (in Russian), TimeOut St. Petersburg, Sept. 20, 2007.
 Interzone: Dreamachine – Machine à rêver
Online Dreamachine application
JavaScript Dreamachine
Info on Dreamachine iOS and Android app
An open-source mobile-friendly Dreamachine App
Dreamachine Simulator on YouTube, using Gysin's original frequency and cut out specifications.

Beat Generation
Devices to alter consciousness
Psychedelia
William S. Burroughs